The Queen's Birthday Honours 2007 for Australia.

Order of Australia

Companion (AC)

General Division

Ref:

Military Division

Ref:

Officer (AO)

General Division

Military Division

Member (AM)

General Division

Military Division

Medal (OAM)

General Division

Military Division

Meritorious Service

Public Service Medal (PSM)

Australian Fire Service Medal (AFSM)

Ambulance Service Medal (ASM)

Emergency Services Medal (ESM)

Distinguished and Conspicuous Service

Distinguished Service Cross (DSC)

Commendation for Distinguished Service

Conspicuous Service Cross (CSC)

Bar to the Conspicuous Service Cross (CSC and Bar)

Conspicuous Service Medal (CSM)

Nursing Service Cross (NSC)

References

2007 awards
Orders, decorations, and medals of Australia
2007 awards in Australia